August Christian Baumann (25 May 1770 – 3 November 1831) was a Norwegian mine superintendent and politician.

Baumann was born in Bodenseich near Lüneburg in Germany. He came to Norway and Kristiania in his youth, and was hired as head dispenser at a pharmacy. Baumann eventually became acquainted with Bernt Anker, who recommended the study of mining. Baumann carried through the studies, and became a mine superintendent for Southeastern Norway. In 1816, when the Kongsberg Silver Mines were reopened, Baumann was elected as a member of the board of directors.

He served as a deputy representative to the Norwegian Parliament in 1821, representing the constituency of Kongsberg. He met in parliamentary sessions whenever the regular member, Hans Wølner Kofoed, was unable to do so.

References

1770 births
1831 deaths
Deputy members of the Storting
Buskerud politicians
People from Kongsberg
German emigrants to Norway